is an Echizen Railway railway station located in the city of Fukui, Fukui Prefecture, Japan. It serves both the Katsuyama Eiheiji and Mikuni Awara lines.

Lines
It is also the terminal station of the Mikuni Awara Line, although most trains continue on to Fukui Station using the Katsuyama Eiheiji Line tracks.

Station layout
The station consists of one elevated island platform with the station building located underneath. The station is staffed.

Adjacent stations

History
Fukuiguchi Station was opened on February 11, 1914. The line was extended between Fukuiguchi — Awara (now ) on December 30, 1928. On September 1, 1942 the Keifuku Electric Railway merged with Mikuni Awara Electric Railway. Operations were halted from June 25, 2001. The station reopened on July 20, 2003 as an Echizen Railway station. There were two island platforms and one other platform with a total of five tracks. On September 27, 2015 the station moved to temporary facilities
, and reopened as an elevated station on June 24, 2018.

Surrounding area
Echizen Railway company headquarters
Keifuku Bus Reservation Center
Fukui Prefectural Hospital
Fukui Prefecture Fukui East School for the Disabled
Fukui Shiiguchi Post Office
Fukui City Shinmei Junior High Schoolt

See also
 List of railway stations in Japan

References

External links

  

Railway stations in Fukui Prefecture
Railway stations in Japan opened in 1914
Mikuni Awara Line
Katsuyama Eiheiji Line
Fukui (city)